Sarran is a commune in the Corrèze department in central France.

It is the home of the Jacques Chirac presidential museum.

Population

See also
Communes of the Corrèze department

References

Communes of Corrèze